Huang Junxia (born October 9, 1975 in Panshi, Jilin City, Jilin) is a female Chinese field hockey player who competed in the 2000 Summer Olympics and in the 2004 Summer Olympics.

In 2000, she was part of the Chinese team which finished fifth in the women's competition. She played all seven matches.

Four years later she finished fourth with the Chinese team in the women's competition. She played all six matches.

References
profile

External links
 

1975 births
Living people
Chinese female field hockey players
Field hockey players at the 2000 Summer Olympics
Field hockey players at the 2004 Summer Olympics
Field hockey players at the 2008 Summer Olympics
Olympic field hockey players of China
Olympic silver medalists for China
Sportspeople from Jilin City
Asian Games medalists in field hockey
Olympic medalists in field hockey
Medalists at the 2008 Summer Olympics
Field hockey players at the 1994 Asian Games
Field hockey players at the 1998 Asian Games
Field hockey players at the 2002 Asian Games
Field hockey players at the 2006 Asian Games
Medalists at the 1994 Asian Games
Medalists at the 1998 Asian Games
Medalists at the 2002 Asian Games
Medalists at the 2006 Asian Games
Asian Games gold medalists for China
Asian Games bronze medalists for China